Kjose is a village in Larvik, Vestfold county, Norway.

References

Populated places in Vestfold og Telemark
Larvik